Santa Barbara was a station on the Port Authority of Allegheny County's light rail network, located in Bethel Park, Pennsylvania. The street level stop was designed as a small commuter stop, serving area residents who walked to the train so they could be taken toward Downtown Pittsburgh.  Both directional stops were only accessible via walkways near the intersection of Milford Dr. and Wyncote Rd. and beyond the dead end of South Conestoga Dr.

Santa Barbara was one of eleven stops closed on June 25, 2012 as part of a system-wide consolidation effort.

References

External links 

Port Authority T Stations Listings
Conestoga Drive entrance from Google Maps Street View

Former Port Authority of Allegheny County stations
Railway stations in the United States opened in 1987
Railway stations closed in 2012